Glympis is a genus of moths of the family Erebidae. The genus was erected by Francis Walker in 1859.

Taxonomy
The genus has previously been classified in the subfamily Phytometrinae within Erebidae or in the subfamily Calpinae of the family Noctuidae.

Species
Glympis arenalis (Walker, [1866]) Dominican Republic
Glympis brunneigrisea Hampson, 1926 Paraguay
Glympis concors (Hübner, 1823) Texas, Puerto Rico, Guatemala, Colombia, Suriname
Glympis damoetesalis (Walker, [1859]) Venezuela
Glympis eubolialis (Walker, [1866]) Antilles
Glympis holothermes Hampson, 1926 Jamaica, Florida
Glympis nigripuncta Hampson, 1926 Brazil
Glympis phaeotherma Hampson, 1926 Paraguay
Glympis poliophaea Hampson, 1926 Brazil
Glympis subterminalis Hampson, 1924 Trinidad

References

Boletobiinae
Noctuoidea genera